Santa Maria Assunta is a Roman Catholic church located in the Piazza Beato Giacomo in Cerqueto, neighborhood of the town of Marsciano, Province of Perugia, region of Umbria, Italy. 

A church was located at the site since 1163, and ins mentioned in documents of emperor Frederick Barbarossa. The interior contains a fresco depicting St Sebastian (1478) one of the earliest work of Pietro Vannucci. Fragments of a St Roch and St Peter remain. The church also has a 15th-century Crucifixion frescoed by Tiberio di Diotallevi of Assisi.

References

Churches in the province of Perugia
12th-century Roman Catholic church buildings in Italy